Remote Radar Head Benbecula or RRH Benbecula, is an air defence radar station operated by the Royal Air Force. It is located at Cleitreabhal a'Deas,  from Lochmaddy on the isle of North Uist in the Outer Hebrides of Scotland.

The radar site was previously known as RAF Benbecula, the name having previously been associated with an RAF airfield on the island of Benbecula (now known as Benbecula Airport) and a nearby weapons testing range (now known as MoD Hebrides).

History

Radar station 
Although Benbecula Airport is now a civilian airfield, a military presence remained and the RAF Benbecula name continued when a radar station was established. A control and reporting centre, part of the UK Air Surveillance And Control System (ASACS), was constructed at the airfield which linked it to RAF Buchan in Aberdeenshire.

The station was downgraded in the late 1990s to a remote radar head and the RAF pulled-out of the main airfield site at Benbecula. Initially under the command and control of RAF Buchan, responsibility was transferred to RAF Boulmer in Northumberland in September 2004.

Benbecula operated several radar types until the Type 92 (more widely known out-with RAF service as the Lockheed Martin AN/FPS-117 ) came into service in the 1980s. The Type 92 was replaced in 2015 with a new Lockheed Martin AN/TPS-77 system. The new radar was funded by wind farm developers and was installed in order to help reduce the impact of interference from wind turbines.

Weapons range 
The British Army also had a large presence in the Outer Hebrides, operating the artillery Deep Sea Range on South Uist. This role was passed to the Defence Evaluation and Research Agency (eventually to become QinetiQ), who remain at the Benbecula and South Uist sites, collectively known as MOD Hebrides.

Operations 
The radar collects data as part of the UK Air Surveillance And Control System (ASACS) based at RAF Boulmer. From there the station is monitored and controlled to support the creation of the recognised air picture for the United Kingdom. The radar site also accommodates several types of VHF and UHF ground-to-air transmitters.

Radar Flight (North) of the ASACS Engineering & Logistics Squadron based at RAF Boulmer has command and control of RRH Buchan and ensures its operational availability.

As part of a major upgrade of RRH sites around the U.K. the MOD began a programme titled HYDRA in 2020 to install new state of the art communications buildings, radar towers and bespoke perimeter security.

See also
 Improved United Kingdom Air Defence Ground Environment – UK air defence radar system in the UK between the 1990s and 2000s
Linesman/Mediator – UK air defence radar system in the UK between the 1960s and 1984
List of Royal Air Force stations
NATO Integrated Air Defense System

References

Buildings and structures in the Outer Hebrides
Radar stations
Benbecula
North Uist
Radar equipment of the Cold War